Norman Pfeiffer (born 1940), is an architect in Los Angeles. For 37 years he was a partner in Hardy Holzman Pfeiffer Associates (HHPA).  After that firm dissolved in 2004, he formed Pfeiffer Partners, the firm he currently heads.

Early life and education

Norman Pfeiffer was born and raised in Seattle. His grandfather was a contractor and Pfeiffer developed early interest in architecture.  He received his professional B.Arch. degree cum laude from the University of Washington, in 1964.  During his years in school he worked for Paul Hayden Kirk & Associates and Kirk, Wallace, McKinley & Associates.  He earned his M.Arch. degree at Columbia University in 1965.

Career

Following graduation, Pfeiffer went to work for Hugh Hardy & Associates.  In 1967 with Hugh Hardy and Malcolm Holzman, he founded Hardy Holzman Pfeiffer Associates (HHPA).  The firm grew and prospered for the next 37 years.

The firm initially designed residential buildings and schools, but gradually won larger more complex commissions.  They became known for their innovative designs for performing arts facilities and for museums, as well as for preservation, renovation and adaptive reuse projects. HHPA received over 100 national design awards, including the American Institute of Architects' Architecture Firm Award in 1981.   All three partners became AIA Fellows; Pfeiffer was elevated to Fellowship in 1981.

In 1986, as the firm's practice was expanding nationally, Norman Pfeiffer moved to Los Angeles to open an HHPA office in that city.

When HHPA dissolved in 2004, Norman Pfeiffer restructured the Los Angeles office as Pfeiffer Partners. (This firm later opened a branch office in New York.)  Today Pfeiffer Partners is an office of about fifty that continues to take on cultural projects including museums, performing arts centers, educational buildings and a variety of preservation projects.

References

Further reading
 Hardy Holzman Pfeiffer: Buildings and Projects, 1967-1992 Rizzoli, New York, 1992.  .

External links
 Pfeiffer Partners

1940 births
Living people
Architects from Seattle
Columbia Graduate School of Architecture, Planning and Preservation alumni
Architects from Los Angeles
University of Washington College of Built Environments alumni
Fellows of the American Institute of Architects